NGC 7777 is a lenticular galaxy in the constellation of Pegasus.

See also
 Lenticular galaxy
 List of NGC objects (7000–7840)

References

External links
 

Pegasus (constellation)
Lenticular galaxies
7777